The 2002 Central American and Caribbean Games were held in San Salvador, El Salvador from 27 November through 7 December 2002. The defending champion Cuban national baseball team did not come, citing security concerns.

 won its second Gold for baseball in a Central American and Caribbean Games, both of which came when Cuba skipped the event.

 claimed Silver.

 won Bronze.

 was 4th at 4-3.

Final standing

2002 Central American and Caribbean Games
2002
Central American and Caribbean Games